Jehle  is a surname. Notable people with the name include:

 Peter Jehle (born 1982), Liechtensteiner footballer
 Geoffrey A. Jehle, American professor of economics
 Herbert Jehle (1907–1983), German-American physicist
 Dietrich Jehle (born 1954), American ER Physician
 Johannes A. Jehle (born 1961), German biologist
 Joseph Jehle (fl. 1920), Swiss sports shooter
 Rudolf Jehle (born 1894),  Liechtensteiner sports shooter
 Xavier Jehle, founder of Jehle automotive company in Liechtenstein